Proteus Gowanus was an interdisciplinary gallery and reading room founded in 2005 in Gowanus, Brooklyn. The gallery, which curated year-long theme-based shows, took its name from shape-shifting Greek sea god Proteus and the nearby Gowanus Canal. Proteus Gowanus closed on June 28, 2015.

In 2006, The Village Voice praised Proteus Gowanus in its annual "Best of NYC" issue, calling the gallery "[the] best proof that the Gowanus Arts District may not be entirely a real estate fiction."

References

External links
Proteus Gowanus website

Contemporary art galleries in the United States
2005 establishments in New York City
Art museums and galleries in Brooklyn
Art galleries established in 2005
Defunct art museums and galleries in New York City
2015 disestablishments in New York (state)
Gowanus, Brooklyn